Colombitherium is an extinct mammal from Late Eocene Colombia. It has originally been assigned to the order Pyrotheria and the family Colombitheriidae, although a later detailed analysis of the fossil questions that classification. A fossil jawbone of approximately  length of Colombitherium has been found by Texas Petroleum in 1945, in the Upper Eocene strata of the middle Gualanday Group in the department of Tolima, Central Ranges of the Colombian Andes.

Etymology 
The genus Colombitherium means "Beast from Colombia". The species epithet tolimense refers to the department of Tolima, where the type species has been found.

Description 
The teeth, molars and premolars of a kind known as bilophodont, which are present in the pyrotheres - were considered as evidence that this genus could be an ancestor of the advanced pyrotheres as Pyrotherium. Colombitherium has first been described by Hoffstetter in 1970, with a revised interpretation published by Billet et al. in 2010. The detailed descriptions by Billet et al. show the differences between Colombitherium and other pyrotherians: the features of the bilophodont teeth of Colombitherium are actually found in several groups of placental mammals, which implies that Colombitherium and another possibly related taxon, Proticia could not be part of Pyrotheria. The authors maintain "the referral of Colombitherium to Pyrotheria is therefore weakly supported, and it must be considered as highly hypothetical." In any case, the lack of further evidence means that Colombitherium and Proticia must be classified in a separate family, Colombitheriidae which is tentatively classified as a primitive clade in Pyrotheria.

Also the absolute age of the strata where the fossil jawbone has been found is questioned. The age has been originally defined by De Porta in 1962 on the basis of the pollen Verrucatosporites usmensis and Cicatricosisporites sp. The last occurrence of Echitriporites trianguliformis orbicularis indicates a Late Eocene to Early Oligocene age for the upper layers of the Gualanday Group.

See also 
 Pyrotherium, a similar mammal from the Late Oligocene of Argentina and Bolivia

References

Bibliography

External links 
  Colombitherium tolimense - Paleontología en Colombia

Meridiungulata
Eocene mammals of South America
Paleogene Colombia
Fossils of Colombia
Fossil taxa described in 1970
Taxa named by Robert Hoffstetter
Prehistoric placental genera